Cloak (Tyrone "Ty" Johnson) and Dagger (Tandy Bowen) are a superhero duo appearing in American comic books published by Marvel Comics. Created by writer Bill Mantlo and artist Ed Hannigan, the characters first appeared in Peter Parker, the Spectacular Spider-Man #64 (March 1982).

Marvel Television produced a two-season self-titled live-action television series set in the Marvel Cinematic Universe, with Aubrey Joseph as Ty Johnson and Olivia Holt as Tandy Bowen. Additionally, Joseph and Holt reprised their roles in the third season of Runaways following the former series' cancellation.

Concept and creation
The inspiration for Cloak and Dagger came to Bill Mantlo after a visit to Ellis Island. He recounted, "They came in the night, when all was silent and my mind was blank. They came completely conceived as to their powers and attributes, their origin and motivation. They embodied between them all that fear and misery, hunger and longing that had haunted me on Ellis Island."

Ed Hannigan, Mantlo's artist collaborator on Peter Parker, the Spectacular Spider-Man, recalled that he and Mantlo jointly came up with the characters' visual design: "Bill had a short page or two synopsis of the story that he showed me, and we discussed what the characters would look like. He gave me a lot of leeway, but it was fairly obvious that Cloak would be black and have a big 'animated' black cloak and Dagger would be white with a skintight leotard-type thing. I am not sure, but I think I might have come up with her ballet angle. I put the same kind of amulet/clasp on both costumes and came up with the dagger-shaped cutout on her costume, which was quite daring at the time."

Publication history
Cloak and Dagger first appeared in Peter Parker, the Spectacular Spider-Man #64 (March 1982). After a number of additional Spider-Man guest appearances, they were given their own four-issue limited series, written by creator Bill Mantlo, penciled by Rick Leonardi, and inked by Terry Austin. It debuted in October 1983 and was a success, prompting Marvel Comics to launch an ongoing bi-monthly Cloak and Dagger series in 1985, with the same creative team. Costumed supervillains rarely appeared in the series, which focused on Cloak and Dagger's quest to end the drug trade completely, and frequently explored the issue of vigilantism. Leonardi left after issue #6 and was replaced by a series of fill-in pencillers.

After issue #11, Marvel combined the bi-monthly titles Cloak and Dagger and Doctor Strange into a monthly revival of the double-feature series Strange Tales. The title change was accompanied by Bret Blevins stepping in as both penciller and inker. Austin would briefly return, but as the series writer this time, Mantlo having ended his run with issue #6. Though still successful, Cloak and Dagger's sales had been declining for some time, and Marvel's editorial staff felt that a new writer was needed to revitalize the characters. Austin immediately introduced Cloak and Dagger's first nemesis, Mister Jip. In 1988, they starred in Marvel Graphic Novel #34: Cloak and Dagger: Predator and Prey, which was written by Mantlo before his departure from the series. Strange Tales ran 19 issues before Marvel decided to split Cloak and Dagger and Dr. Strange back into separate bi-monthly titles.

The series, The Mutant Misadventures of Cloak and Dagger, was written by Austin and penciled by Mike Vosburg. Dagger was rendered blind in the first issue, and her struggles to deal with this new disability were a major theme of the series. Austin did extensive research at the American Foundation for the Blind so he could give an authentic depiction of the physical and psychological impacts of going blind and the coping techniques used by blind people. With issue #14 Steve Gerber and Terry Kavanagh took over the writing, but sales began to falter and the series was canceled with issue #19.

The pair continued to make numerous appearances as guest stars in titles such as Runaways and the Spider-Man Maximum Carnage story arc, as well as starring in their own adventures in anthology titles like Marvel Comics Presents. Cloak made a solo appearance in issues of the miniseries House of M, as a member of an underground human resistance movement. It was uncertain if Dagger also existed in the altered reality of "House of M" as there were no mentions of her during that storyline.

They have appeared in various other Marvel Universes, one of which included a storyline where Cloak was killed. Dagger also served as a member of Marvel Knights in a short running mini-series.

It was announced at the 2008 San Diego Comic Con that the team would be reappearing once again in their own five-part mini-series by writer Valerie D'Orazio, with pencils by Irene Flores and colors by Emily Warren.

They appeared in the Dark Avengers/Uncanny X-Men crossover "Utopia", in which writer Matt Fraction stated they would be presented with a chance "to have their reputations exonerated and their records sealed [if they join the Dark X-Men]." Fraction explained, "Osborn presents it to them as the ultimate public service, [in which] they can work off their past indiscretions—[such as] Cloak's dealings with the Avengers during the Skrull invasion." Fraction claimed the more appealing part of Dark X-Men was to see how Cloak and Dagger react in a real superhero team scenario.

To tie in with the 2015 storyline "Secret Wars", ND Stevenson and Sanford Greene created a spin-off series based on Runaways.

Fictional character biography

Origin
Tyrone "Ty" Johnson (Cloak) and Tandy Bowen (Dagger) meet in New York City as runaways. Tyrone is a 17-year-old boy from Boston, Massachusetts, with a stutter who ran away from his struggling parents to New York City when his speech impediment prevented him from stopping his friend from being shot by the police, who mistakenly believed he had just robbed a store. Tandy is a 16-year-old girl from a privileged upbringing (born in Shaker Heights, Ohio) who ran away because her multi-millionaire mother was too busy with a supermodel career and social life to spend time with her daughter. When they meet, Tyrone considers stealing Tandy's purse, but before he can, a thief steals it and Tyrone retrieves it for her. Afterwards, they have dinner and quickly become friends. When naïve Tandy accepts an offer of shelter from some strange men, wary Tyrone goes along to protect her. The two teens are soon forcibly delivered to Simon Marshall, a criminal chemist who's developing a new synthetic heroin for Silvermane and the Maggia with tests on runaway teens that have fatal results. Johnson and Bowen somehow survive injections of the drug and they flee. During their escape, the drug turns them into super-powered beings. Tyrone finds himself engulfed in darkness and seized by a strange hunger that eases in the presence of Tandy who now glows with a brilliant light. Tyrone tries to hide his shadowy appearance in a makeshift cloak by absorbing Marshall's thugs into his darkness while Tandy strikes them down with daggers of light. The two teens dub themselves "Cloak & Dagger", declaring war on drug crime and helping runaway children. They are aided by local priest Father Delgado and Detective Brigid O'Reilly.

During Cloak and Dagger's travels around the world, Dagger is briefly reunited with her father, a type of guru in India who develops an ability to manipulate personal "light" like Tandy, but uses as a form of control over others to increase his own power, seemingly killing Ty when he interferes with personal plans. Cloak and Dagger oppose the Lord of Light who flings himself into Cloak's portal.

Later it is revealed that during this time, D'Spayre had been manipulating these events from behind the scenes.

War on Drugs and other heroes
Cloak and Dagger became vigilantes and hunted and killed Simon Marshall's drug-dealing crime-ring responsible for activating their powers. They first encountered Spider-Man during these events. They next murdered Silvermane's reanimated cyborg form in revenge. They next teamed with Spider-Man to thwart the Punisher's murder attempt on the Kingpin.

When their activities became too damaging for the illegal drug trade, some dealers kidnapped members of the New Mutants and tried to control them by injecting them with a drug similar to that which gave the duo their powers. For a time, they lost their powers to the heroes Sunspot and Wolfsbane but they cooperated in retrieving them when it was learned the others were not handling it well. Cloak and Dagger saved them with Spider-Man, but turned down an offer to join the X-Men's School for Gifted Youngsters. Cloak and Dagger battled Silvermane and the Answer. Kingpin wanted Dagger to help heal Vanessa Fisk, but Dagger refused to help. Cloak & Dagger befriended the superpowered preteens Power Pack and twice aided the New Mutants, junior trainees of the X-Men. The duo eventually learned they were mutants themselves, which is also the reason why they were the only test subjects to survive the drug's administration in the first place. Though they tend to target ordinary street criminals, they have faced such diverse foes as Doctor Doom, the Beyonder, Vermin, the Zapper, the Disciplinarian, the Warlord of Kampuchea, Mephisto, Thanos, the Assembly of Evil, Firebrand, and Lightmaster.

Cloak and Dagger encountered the Beyonder during Secret Wars II. They also encountered Brigid O'Reilly who was transformed into Mayhem. They next encountered Doctor Doom in Latveria. Alongside Doctor Strange, they battled Ecstasy. They were used in Nightmare's plot to defeat Doctor Strange. They battled Mister Jip, and Night and Day. They also encountered Power Pack again.

Dagger was later possessed by Night, and battled X-Factor, and lost her sight temporarily. Cloak and Dagger battled Hydro-Man, the second Jester, the Hulk android, Rock, and Fenris alongside the Avengers. Dagger later regained her sight, and helped defeat Mister Jip. Cloak later unknowingly met his twin sister. Cloak and Dagger later battled D'Spayre, learning that he gave them their Dark Form and Light Form, which had been pieces of his soul, which interfered with their natural mutations.

Dagger was one of the 'seven brides' selected for the serpent god Set in the Atlantis Attacks crossover storyline, the other six being Jean Grey, the Invisible Woman, Andromeda, She-Hulk, Storm, and the Scarlet Witch.

Cloak and Dagger played a small part in the Infinity Gauntlet saga. When Thanos used the power of the Infinity Gauntlet to sacrifice half of the population of the universe to Death, Dagger was among the superheroes that vanished. Cloak answered the summons of Adam Warlock to join a task force of the remaining superheroes to fight Thanos. During the assault on Thanos by the assembled team, Cloak managed to pull Thanos into the Darkforce Dimension, but was killed when Thanos released a massive amount of energy from within him; all that was left were pieces of his cloak. His life was restored after most of the events were undone by Nebula after she seized the Infinity Gauntlet.

The two tended to live in churches, supported by friends and priests. Cloak has run away many times, not understanding that Dagger is fully willing to use her light power to satisfy his darkness. Cloak & Dagger are devoted to each other, but Dagger often wants more from life. While on an international case, Tandy performed with Eurocirque as Lady Light and shared a romance with a supposed stowaway on a drug boat. Eventually he was exposed as a criminal but ultimately sacrificed himself to save Dagger. Tandy found new friends in the New Warriors who teamed with Cloak, Dagger, and other heroes to defeat the shadow-lunatic Darkling. She also joined the team for a brief period, leading to further tension with Cloak.

"Maximum Carnage"
Cloak and Dagger teamed with Spider-Man, Captain America, Black Cat, Nightwatch, Iron Fist, Deathlok, Morbius, Venom, and Firestar to halt a murderous super villain rampage led by serial killer Cletus Kasady aka Carnage. Dagger was supposedly killed by Shriek (Carnage's "wife") while saving Spider-Man, but was later revealed to be severely wounded and recuperating within Cloak's shroud, and was the key instrument in breaking up the Carnage 'family'.

Marvel Knights
After Tyrone leaves Tandy's side, he is no longer able to control his hunger and consumes any and every lawbreaker, no matter how small the offense. While searching for him in churches she meets the Black Widow who she teams up with to prevent a church from being robbed. Daredevil later appears and both assist him on a mission he received from the Punisher.

Dagger becomes a member of the now-defunct "Marvel Knights" team, partnering up with many different heroes, including Shang-Chi, Luke Cage, Moon Knight and Daredevil. During her time with the Knights, Dagger developed a deep friendship with the Black Widow (Natasha Romanova). Natasha brings Tandy to the guidance of Dr. Strange in the hopes of finding a crazed Tyrone. The Marvel Knights and Dr. Strange locate and battle an enhanced and deranged Cloak, during which most of the group are absorbed into his cape. Dr. Strange reveals that Cloak has become possessed by Nightmare. Tandy manages to overpower and absorb Ty's Cloak powers, freeing everyone from his cape.

For some time, the Black Widow lets Ty and Tandy live in her apartment, which was later attacked by a homicidal Life Model Decoy of Nick Fury. Though at this point he was a normal human, Ty managed to defeat the robot.

Runaways
Cloak and Dagger make their return in Runaways, in which Tyrone appears repowered and stable. At one stage, the LAPD recruited the team to locate the Runaways. During their initial encounter, Dagger quickly knocked out Nico Minoru with her light and Cloak easily absorbed Chase Stein, Karolina Dean, Alex Wilder, and Nico. Gertrude Yorkes was able to halt Dagger's light attacks with her dinosaur Old Lace, as Dagger's light had no effect on animals, and Molly Hayes managed to pull Cloak's cloak from his body, severing his connection to the Darkforce Dimension. This caused a ceasefire, during which time Gertrude and Molly explained to Cloak and Dagger that the LAPD were actually corrupt and under the control of the Runaways' supervillain parents, the Pride. Cloak managed to reconnect to his cloak and rescue the Runaways he had absorbed, and he and Dagger both promised to return to New York and bring back the Avengers to stop the Pride and rescue the Runaways. However, the traitor in the Runaways—Alex—instead contacted the LAPD, which had the Pride erase Tandy's and Ty's actual memories of the group, thus preventing them from helping the Runaways.

Cloak was later impersonated by Reginald Mantz who was using Mutant Growth Hormone to replicate Cloak's powers. Mantz, stalked and attacked Dagger, leaving her hospitalized. After a fight with the New Avengers led to him sustaining a blow to the head, Cloak regained his memories and requested the Runaways' assistance in clearing his name, as he had been framed for attacking Dagger. Cloak appealed to the fact that they all shared bonds in being runaways and explains the reasons he and Dagger never helped them as planned. They agreed to help, and successfully helped Cloak apprehend his impostor, the delusional orderly, Reginald Mantz, who believed that he and Tandy were in a relationship.

"Civil War"
Cloak and Dagger are revealed to be members of Captain America's faction of super heroes who oppose the Superhuman Registration Act during the 2006 "Civil War" storyline.

Cloak is shot by S.H.I.E.L.D. tranquilizers while teleporting Captain America and the rebel faction to a chemical plant where they believed a catastrophic accident had taken place. It turns out to be a trap set by Iron Man waiting with the pro-registration faction. Dagger is hit with a lightning attack by a clone of Thor.

It is then revealed that the pair were captured during a mission in Queens and jailed in the Negative Zone prison. They are freed by the shapeshifter Hulkling, who was disguised as the pro-registration Hank Pym, which leads to the climactic battle between the two sides, both of which Cloak teleports to Times Square, New York.

"Secret Invasion"
Luke Cage calls Cloak, who drops the New Avengers at the top of Stark Tower to steal one of Tony Stark's quinjets. When Cage offers to take him with them to find the downed Skrull ship, Cloak refuses, and vanishes.

Dark X-Men and "Utopia"
Norman Osborn tracks down Tandy and Tyrone in Colombia, burning down drug fields and approaches them to join his new team of X-Men. Initially against it, as they know of Osborn's past and do not consider themselves mutants, Osborn tells them that they can take their war on drugs to a global scale as well as having no trouble with police anymore. Dagger agrees to the deal for them both, but Cloak remains hesitant.

Cloak and Dagger are later recruited into the Dark X-Men by Osborn. After Emma Frost's and Namor's betrayal of the team, Emma offers them the opportunity to join the real X-Men and their exodus from the US, to which both instantly agree. During their time with the X-Men, Cloak becomes involved with Wolverine's plan to kill Romulus along with Bruce Banner and Skaar. Dagger is kidnapped and Romulus orders her to be beaten. Wolverine and Cloak manage to save her, and Wolverine kills her kidnapper, much to her chagrin. However, she tells Tyrone to continue helping Wolverine, as he needs his help. Aiding Wolverine, Cloak uses his power to trap Romulus in the Darkforce dimension. However, Romulus later escapes and fights with Wolverine and Cloak.

2010 Cloak and Dagger one-shot
After doing tests on Dagger, Dr. Nemesis confirms that they are not mutants, disappointing her as she enjoyed being on a team. It is revealed later that Tyrone was cheating on her with Tia, a girl from his old neighborhood. Eventually, Tia reveals that she knows his secret identity as Cloak and has him kidnapped, torturing him to keep him from using his powers. Dagger becomes worried after he does not return home after a few days and manages to track him down. With the help of X-Men Anole and Dr. Nemesis, she fights off his captors whereupon Tia reveals that she has powers as well and has been brainwashed to hate them. Tia manages to escape the fight and Tandy and Tyrone decide to leave Utopia and the X-Men and return to New York to work on rekindling their relationship.

"Spider-Island"
In the "Spider-Island" storyline as Cloak and Dagger are established to have been left homeless after their home was determined by authorities to be in violation of building codes. They then were confronted by the Avengers who informed them about the present spider problem at hand. It's also revealed that Dagger is attending college classes as an attempt to normalize her life. Cloak has contradicting views as he acknowledges them as "special". After Mister Negative hears of a prophecy that he is destined to be killed by Dagger, he kidnaps her and corrupts her with his negative touch; her powers are changed, now working through the Dark Force. Similar to Cloak, she gets the "hunger" for light and starts dying from the lack of it. Cloak pleads with Mister Negative to give him the touch. He surprisingly agrees, altering Cloak's abilities to be powered by light. Cloak feeds Dagger his light, causing an explosion. In the aftermath it is revealed that Dagger now has Cloak's original powers, and Cloak has Dagger's. This change in powers recalls the reference to D'Spayre's influence on their life, as according to him in the final issue of their original run, these were the power sets they were always originally meant to have, but D'Spayre interfered, resulting in Cloak and Dagger having 'reversed' power sets, and considered weaker than what they would have been had D'Spayre not gotten involved in their lives.

All-New, All-Different Marvel
Following the Secret Wars storyline as part of the All-New, All-Different Marvel' initiative, Cloak and Dagger have returned, still using the other's powers, but are now evil due to the corrupting influence of Mister Negative. Although Martin Li was arrested at some point, Cloak and Dagger have been using Shade patches, which dose them with a drug that stimulates the effects of Negative's touch, ensuring that their criminal personas will 'remain' loyal to him, breaking him out of the prison ship where Li was being kept and restoring him to Mister Negative to lead an assault on Parker Industries in Japan. Although Peter is able to escape being corrupted by Negative thanks to Negative's prior corruption of Spider-Man, Cloak and Dagger manage to help Negative escape when Peter tracks them to his Hong Kong headquarters by secretly placing a Spider-Tracer on Cloak. Using this tracer, Peter is able to inject Cloak with a cure for Shade that he later uses to cure Dagger, apparently restoring their original powers. Although Mister Negative has escaped, Cloak and Dagger decide to remain in Hong Kong to guard it from any future attacks.

Powers and abilities
Cloak and Dagger both have moderate experience at street fighting. Dagger's combat techniques utilize her Lightforce powers and ballet-dance training as well as her sense of spatial relations, which had been heightened by her temporary blindness. 

Tyrone and Tandy temporary swapped powers in "Spider-Island," with Cloak using light powers and Dagger using Darkforce daggers. When Parker Industries uses an antidote on Mister Negative, the pair swap back to their original powers.

Cloak
Tyrone Johnson acquired D'Spayre's Dark Form, which gave him the ability to create an aperture into the Darkforce Dimension and to dispatch people into the dimension. He also gained the abilities of intangibility and the teleportation of himself and others through the Darkforce Dimension. "Marvel's Cloak and Dagger TV Show Explained: Who Are These Heroes?"  People enveloped by Cloak's darkness feel numbing cold and experience terrifying visions of their own greatest fears and nightmares. Prolonged exposure to the darkness can drive people insane. Cloak can teleport by entering the Darkforce Dimension, moving a short distance within it and emerging back on Earth a great distance from his point of origin. A span of miles on Earth can be traversed in only a few steps via shortcuts through the Darkforce. As Cloak, Tyrone is usually intangible, though he can solidify through an act of will, or by absorbing enough "light" to saturate his form temporarily. Cloak feels a constant hunger which can only be assuaged by feeding either on light projected by Dagger or on light consumed from victims dispatched to the dimension of darkness. He later develops better control of his hunger. In addition, he can mentally see the fears of certain people he touches.

Dagger
Tandy has the ability to create a multitude of light daggers from the Lightforce which travel wherever she wills them. The daggers drain living beings of vitality when struck. Her light daggers also have the capacity to cure certain persons of drug addictions and can alleviate Cloak's hunger for light (simultaneously allowing her to avoid becoming overcharged). She can even mentally see the hopes of certain people by touching them.

Species
Cloak and Dagger were considered latent mutants in earlier appearances, whose powers were activated when they were injected with an experimental illegal drug. In later years, they have been listed as mutates, meaning that their powers were derived from an external mutagenic source. This designation was used for them in the Civil War: Battle Damage Report. Some mutants, such as Sunfire, Polaris, and Thunderbird, also required external stimuli to awaken their latent powers.

Uncanny X-Men writer Matt Fraction said, "No, they don't [think of themselves as part of the mutant community], and that's the thing: in a time when there are so few mutants left, can they afford to not at least acknowledge the existence of this community, this family?" In the Utopia crossover, when recruited by Norman Osborn as part of his "Dark X-Men", Cloak and Dagger comment that they aren't mutants. This is confirmed by Doctor Nemesis, who runs a full range of genetics scans on Dagger, reporting that her powers were derived solely from the drug that changed her and Cloak.

Reception

Accolades 

 In 2017, Screen Rant ranked Cloak 10th in their "15 Most Powerful Teleporting Superheroes" list.
 In 2020, Scary Mommy included Dagger in their "Looking For A Role Model? These 195+ Marvel Female Characters Are Truly Heroic" list.
 In 2020, CBR.com ranked Cloak and Dagger 14th in their "25 Best Anti-Heroes In Marvel Comics" list.
 In 2022, Screen Rant included Cloak and Dagger in their "10 Best X-Men Who Aren't Mutants" list and in their  "10 Best Marvel Characters Who Made Their Debut In Spider-Man Comics" list.
 In 2022, CBR.com ranked Cloak 9th in their "10 Strongest Black Superheroes" list.

Other versions

Age of Apocalypse
In the "Age of Apocalypse" storyline, Cloak and Dagger are members of Sinister's Six, who were brainwashed into fighting the X-Men. They were apparently killed in battle though this has yet to be confirmed.

House of M
In the "House of M" storyline, Cloak appears as a member of the Underground Human Resistance led by Luke Cage, regarding Cage as a father figure. No mention of Dagger's whereabouts are made.

League of Losers
Dagger features in an arc of Robert Kirkman's Marvel Team-Up vol. 3, featuring a group of C-list heroes dubbed "The League of Losers". A group of heroes including Speedball, Darkhawk, Dagger, Araña, Gravity, X-23, Sleepwalker, and Terror (although Araña dies along the way) go to the future to prevent the villain Chronok from stealing Reed Richards' time machine, Chronok having come to the present and already having killed all of Marvel's major heroes.

Marvel Zombies
In Marvel Zombies vs. The Army of Darkness Cloak and Dagger, both zombified, are seen in a narrow alley devouring a hapless victim. In Ultimate Fantastic Four #23, Cloak is seen as one of the dozens of zombified heroes who have gathered together to hunt down and eat the last four known unaffected people.

Spider-Ham
In the parody series Spider-Ham, the duo are parodied as Croak and Badger, a frog and a badger.

Ultimate Marvel
Two women dressed as Cloak and Dagger are both in handcuffs (for an unknown offense) when Ronin stumbles into a police station to provide evidence against the Kingpin.

The Ultimate Marvel versions of Cloak (Ty Johnson) and Dagger (Tandy Bowen) officially debut during a battle against Bombshell. A series of flashbacks reveal that the two were high school sweethearts who were critically injured in a car accident while on the way to their senior prom. Roxxon's Brain Trust had the two teens declared legally dead and used as test subjects in an experiment involving dark matter, resulting in Tandy and Ty gaining superpowers. Eventually, Cloak & Dagger as well as Bombshell assist Spider-Man and Spider-Woman in fighting Roxxon's Brain Trust as well as confronting Donald Roxxon. The two later joined The Young Ultimates. They along with their team, as well as the Ultimate Universe in general, were destroyed during the events of Secret Wars. They all supposedly came back afterwards.

"Universe X"
In the 2000 miniseries Universe X, Ty Johnson is dead, but his cloak is still carried by Dagger. Mar-Vell is given the cloak by Dagger and uses it as a teleportation device and a gateway to the Realm of the Dead.

Battleworld Runaways
Cloak and Dagger are similar to what happened in Spider-Island, only Tandy is Cloak instead of Dagger and Tyrone is Dagger instead of Cloak. This alternate version of Cloak and Dagger are revealed to be siblings, even when people mistake them to be a romantic couple.

In other media

Television
 Cloak and Dagger appear in Ultimate Spider-Man, voiced by Phil LaMarr and Ashley Eckstein respectively. In the duo's self-titled episode, Cloak was possessed by Dormammu as part of a plot to capture Doctor Strange, Iron Fist, and White Tiger to power the Siege Perilous and invade Earth. With Dagger's help, Spider-Man was able to free Cloak from Dormammu's possession, rescue the other heroes, and defeat Dormammu. Spider-Man intended to recruit them into his New Warriors, but they declined, having been recruited into Taskmaster's Thunderbolts under the belief that no could be trusted. In "New Warriors", the Thunderbolts attacked S.H.I.E.L.D.'s Tri-Carrier in an attempt to free the Green Goblin, only to come into conflict with Spider-Man and the New Warriors. During the fight, Cloak and Dagger defect to Spider-Man's team after Taskmaster abandons them. In subsequent episodes, they help the other trainees of S.H.I.E.L.D. Academy against various villains.
 Cloak and Dagger appear in television series set in the Marvel Cinematic Universe (MCU), with Aubrey Joseph and Olivia Holt cast as the duo, while Maceo Smedley III and Rachel Ryals respectively portray them as children. They first appeared in their own television series, which relocated them to a post-Hurricane Katrina New Orleans. That series premiered on June 7, 2018 on Freeform. and depicted them developing their powers after being exposed to energies that were released when the Roxxon Gulf Platform collapsed. The duo then appear in the third and final season of the live-action series Runaways. After making a brief appearance at the end of the episode "Left-Hand Path" to stop Nico Minoru from entering the Dark Dimension, they feature prominently in the following episode "Devil's Torture Chamber", while gathering the rest of the eponymous Runaways to help them rescue Alex Wilder before taking their leave once the mission succeeds.
 Cloak and Dagger appear in Spider-Man, with Aubrey Joseph and Olivia Holt reprising their respective roles. This version of the duo gained their powers after being experimented on by Alchemax and Tiberius Stone.

Film

 In May 2001, Dimension Films signed a deal to create a live-action Cloak and Dagger film, written by David Tischman, and produced by Marvel Studios president Avi Arad and Rick Alexander, and executive produced by Kevin Feige. In 2006, Cloak and Dagger were chosen as one of the many properties in Marvel's new film deal with Paramount Pictures, along with Captain America, Nick Fury, Doctor Strange, Hawkeye, Power Pack, Shang-Chi, and Black Panther.

Video games
 Cloak and Dagger appear as assist characters in Spider-Man and Venom: Maximum Carnage.
 Cloak and Dagger appear as NPCs in Marvel: Ultimate Alliance 2, voiced by Ahmed Best and America Young, respectively. They serve as boss characters in the pro-registration campaign, though Cloak can only be fought on the PS2, PSP, and Wii versions while Dagger can be fought in all versions. In the PS3, PS4, Xbox 360, Xbox One, and PC versions, Dagger joins forces with Colossus to protect Cloak in the pro-registration campaign while the anti-registration campaign sees Dagger protecting Cloak from She-Hulk and Molten Man alone until the player arrives.
 Cloak and Dagger appear as NPCs in Marvel Heroes, voiced by Rick D. Wasserman and Tara Strong, respectively.
 Cloak and Dagger appear as a collective playable character in Marvel: Avengers Alliance.
 Cloak and Dagger appear as playable characters in Marvel Puzzle Quest.
 Cloak and Dagger appear as playable characters in Marvel Avengers Academy.
 Cloak and Dagger appear as playable characters in Lego Marvel Super Heroes 2 as part of a self-titled DLC pack.
 Cloak and Dagger appear in the digital collectible card game Marvel Snap.

Motion comics
Cloak and Dagger appear in the Wolverine versus Sabretooth motion comic, voiced by Adrian Holmes and Mariee Devereux, respectively.

Toys
 In 1997, Toy Biz released a Cloak and Dagger 5" figure box set containing a "collector tin".
 In September 2013, Marvel Universe released Cloak and Dagger action figures in wave 23.
 In 2018, Hasbro released action figures of Cloak and Dagger in their Marvel Legends line.

Collected editions

References

External links
 
 Profiles of Cloak and Dagger at Spiderfan.org
 
 Tyrone Johnson at Spider-Man WikiTandy Bowen at Spider-Man Wiki

Characters created by Bill Mantlo
Comics characters introduced in 1982
Fictional blade and dart throwers
Fictional characters who can manipulate darkness or shadows
Fictional characters who can manipulate light
Fictional characters who can turn intangible
Fictional characters with energy-manipulation abilities
Marvel Comics characters who can teleport
Marvel Comics mutates
Marvel Comics superhero teams
Marvel Comics superheroes
Marvel Comics television characters
Marvel Comics titles
Spider-Man characters
Superhero duos
Teenage superheroes
Vigilante characters in comics